Pediasia torikurai is a moth in the family Crambidae. It was described by Sasaki in 2011. It is found in Japan (Hokkaido).

References

Crambini
Moths described in 2011
Moths of Japan